This is a list of cancelled Sega Game Gear games. The Game Gear was a handheld video game console by Sega. With Sega finding success with their Sega Genesis in the early 1990s against rival Nintendo's SNES, Sega decided to release a handheld competitor to Nintendo's Game Boy - the Game Gear. While the Game Gear was able to find some success from the Genesis's popularity, and its ability to easily port Sega's older Master System games to it, but as the Genesis faded in the mid-1990s, the Game Gear slowed and eventually ended production. While doing better than many competitors, it still ended with a tenth of the units sold as the Game Boy, and towards the end of its life, had many games cancelled while companies focused on Game Boy or other versions instead. This list documents all known games that were confirmed for release for the Game Gear at some point, but did not end up being released for it.

Games

References

Game Gear

Game Gear